Artema is a village in the Shchastia Raion of Luhansk Oblast in eastern Ukraine, situated at about 50 km north from the centre of Luhansk city, on the right bank of the Siverskyi Donets. Prior to 2020, it was part of the former Stanytsia-Luhanska Raion.

Siverskyi Donets has served as a natural separation line between the warring parties during the War in Donbass. A 15 minutes clash between governmental and pro-Russian forces, that took place near the village on 12 September 2016, at around 4:00 pm, resulted in two Ukrainian soldiers killed, five others wounded, and one unaccounted for in action. Later on the missing serviceman was accounted.

Demographics
Native language as of the Ukrainian Census of 2001:
 Russian 76.98%
 Ukrainian 22.48%

References

External links
 Weather forecast for Artema
Shchastia Raion

Villages in Shchastia Raion
Populated places established in 1930